Heino Finkelmann  (born 1945, Gronau) is a retired German chemist in the area of liquid-crystalline elastomers.

Biography
After earning an engineering degree, Finkelmann graduated 1972 as chemist (Diplom) from Technical University of Berlin. 1975 he earned his PhD at the Paderborn University under the supervision of Horst Stegemeyer in Physical Chemistry.

After three years of Postdoc under the guidance of Helmut Ringsdorf at the Johannes Gutenberg University Mainz, Finkelmann habilitated from 1978 to 1984 at the Clausthal University of Technology with the group of Günther Rehage in Physical Chemistry.

From 1984 to 2010  Finkelmann was appointed Full Professor and Director of the Institute for Macromolecular Chemistry at the Albert Ludwig University of Freiburg.

One of his famous works is the concept of the side chain nematic elastomers.

Honours, decorations, awards and distinctions
 1984: Carl Duisberg Memorial Prize from the Society of German Chemists
 2000: Gay-Lussac Humboldt Prize
 2003: Agilent Technologies Europhysics Prize of the European Physical Society
 2004: Doctor Honoris Causa by the University of Toulouse
 2006: George William Gray Medal of the British Liquid Crystal Society

References

1945 births
Living people
20th-century German chemists
Organic chemists
Polymer scientists and engineers
Academic staff of the University of Freiburg
Scientists from Lower Saxony
People from Hildesheim (district)
21st-century German chemists
Academic staff of the Clausthal University of Technology